Olov (or Olof) is a Swedish form of Olav/Olaf, meaning "ancestor's descendant". A common short form of the name is Olle. The name may refer to:

Names of people 
Per-Olov Ahrén (1926–2004), Swedish clergyman, bishop of Lund from 1980 to 1992
Per-Olov Brasar (born 1950), retired professional ice hockey forward
Olov Englund (born 1983), Swedish bandy player
Per Olov Enquist (1934–2020), one of Sweden's internationally best known authors
Olle Hagnell (1924–2011), Swedish psychiatrist
Karl Olov Hedberg (1923–2007), botanist, taxonomist, author, professor at Uppsala University
Olle Hellbom (1925–1982), Swedish film director
Per Olov Jansson (1920–2019), Finnish photographer
Olof Johansson (born 1937), Swedish politician
Per-Olov Kindgren (born 1956), Swedish musician, composer, guitarist and music teacher
Olov Lambatunga, Archbishop of Uppsala, Sweden, 1198–1206
Sven-Olov Lawesson (1926–1988), Swedish chemist known for his popularization of Lawesson's reagent within the chemical community
Sven Olov Lindholm (1903–1998), Swedish Nazi leader, active in Swedish fascist organizations from the 1920s to the 1950s
Per-Olov Löwdin (1916–2000), Swedish physicist, professor at the University of Uppsala from 1960 to 1983
Olof Mellberg (born 1977), Swedish footballer
Olof Mörck (born 1981), Swedish guitarist and songwriter, member of Amaranthe
Olof Palme (1927–1986), Swedish Prime Minister 1969–1976 and 1982–1986
Olle Romo, musician
Olof Rudbeck (1630–1702), internationally known as Olaus Rudbeck (as he wrote his name like that in Latin), Swedish scientist
Sven-Olov Sjödelius (1933–2018), Swedish sprint canoeist who competed from the early 1950s to the early 1960s
Olof Skötkonung (c. 980–1022), king of Sweden 995–1022
Olov Svebilius, Archbishop of Uppsala, Sweden, 1681–1700
Olof Swartz (1760–1818), Swedish scientist
Carl Olof Tallgren (born 1927), Finnish politician
Olof Thorin (1912–2004), Swedish mathematician
Olle Thorell (born 1967), Swedish politician
Zhaleh Olov (born 1927), actress and dubbing artist
Olle Åhlund (1920–1996), Swedish footballer

Fictional characters 
Olof Koskela, a main character of the novel The Song of the Blood-Red Flower by Johannes Linnankoski

Secessionist state 
Republic of Olov (est. 2021), secessionist self-governing republic

References

Swedish masculine given names
Micronations